Koh Puos or Kaoh Puos, Snake Island - named "Île Coudée" (Elbow Island) during the French colonial period) is a small island in the Gulf of Thailand, located about  off the coast of Sihanoukville city in southern Cambodia. It is administered by Sangkat 3 of Mittakpheap District in Sihanoukville Province.

The island has been made accessible via a road bridge, completed in 2011 as part of a development initiative of the Russian Koh Puos Investment Group (KPIG). A long term government concession granted in 2006 was followed by large scale planning of "a high-end property project". Since, a number of project alterations and subsequent applications for permission at the Council of the Development of Cambodia have led to many delays.

See also 
 Koh Ta Kiev
 Koh Russei
 Ream National Park
 List of islands of Cambodia
 Sihanoukville (city)

References

External links
Island Database/List of islands
 Cambodia's islands up for grabs - Phnom Penh Post

Sihanoukville (city)
Populated places in Sihanoukville province
Islands of Cambodia
Islands of the Gulf of Thailand